The Standing Committee on Energy and the Environment is a standing committee of the Parliament of Norway. It is responsible for policies relating to petroleum, energy, hydroelectricity, environmental protection and regional planning. It corresponds to the Ministry of Petroleum and Energy and Ministry of the Environment. The committee has 16 members and is chaired by Ola Elvestuen of the Liberal Party.

Members 2013–17

References

Standing committees of the Storting